James Stacy Coles (June 3, 1913 – June 13, 1996) was the ninth president of Bowdoin College.

Life and career
After having graduated from Columbia University in 1936, Coles earned a PhD in chemistry at Columbia and taught at several educational institutions including Middlebury College and Brown University before becoming president of Bowdoin.  Additionally, for his work in anti-submarine warfare during World War II done at the Underwater Explosives Research Laboratory at Woods Hole, he was awarded the President’s Certificate of Merit.

Coles became president of Bowdoin in 1952 and served until 1968.  Coles was the first president to build dormitories for seniors and saw the sizes of his student body, faculty, and campus grow dramatically.  Notably, the Coles Tower, one of the tallest buildings in Maine, was built during his tenure. Originally known as the Senior Center, the 16-story building was an educational experiment that brought virtually the entire senior class into a single residence hall and made a senior seminar part of each semester's course offerings.

After he left Bowdoin, Coles became president of Research Corporation, a private foundation for the advancement of science and technology.  During his occupancy, the foundation’s assets increased from $11 million to $46 million.

References

External links
https://www.nytimes.com/1996/06/15/us/james-s-coles-83-ex-head-of-bowdoin-college.html
https://web.archive.org/web/20080720141713/http://www.bowdoin.edu/academics/students/fellowships/james-coles.shtml

1913 births
1996 deaths
Educators from Pennsylvania
Middlebury College faculty
Presidents of Bowdoin College
Columbia Graduate School of Arts and Sciences alumni
People from Mansfield, Pennsylvania
Brown University faculty
American people of World War II
20th-century American academics